Woodson is a census-designated place (CDP) in Pulaski County, Arkansas, United States. Its population was 403 at the 2010 census. It is part of the Little Rock–North Little Rock–Conway Metropolitan Statistical Area. Woodson and its accompanying Woodson Lake and Wood Hollow are the namesake for Ed Wood Sr., a prominent plantation owner,  trader, and businessman at the turn of the 20th century. Woodson is adjacent to the Wood Plantation, the largest of the plantations own by Ed Wood Sr.

Geography

Demographics

2020 census

As of the 2020 United States census, there were 346 people, 141 households, and 82 families residing in the CDP.

2000 census
As of the census of 2000, there were 445 people, 177 households, and 113 families residing in the CDP. The racial makeup of the CDP was 24.94% White, 73.93% Black or African American, and 1.12% from two or more races.

There were 177 households, out of which 27.7% had children under the age of 18 living with them, 42.4% were married couples living together, 19.8% had a female householder with no husband present, and 35.6% were non-families. 33.3% of all households were made up of individuals, and 10.7% had someone living alone who was 65 years of age or older.  The average household size was 2.51 and the average family size was 3.26.

In the CDP, the population was spread out, with 23.8% under the age of 18, 7.4% from 18 to 24, 25.2% from 25 to 44, 29.2% from 45 to 64, and 14.4% who were 65 years of age or older.  The median age was 41 years. For every 100 females, there were 87.0 males.  For every 100 females age 18 and over, there were 90.4 males.

The median income for a household in the CDP was $28,750, and the median income for a family was $35,781. Males had a median income of $22,143 versus $30,893 for females. The per capita income for the CDP was $12,854.  About 13.5% of families and 15.4% of the population were below the poverty line, including 12.1% of those under age 18 and none of those age 65 or over.

History
Ed Wood, Sr. founded a settlement in central Arkansas after migrating from Alabama with his mother circa 1880. What is now called Woodson was known for much of the area's early history as "Wood Hollow" in recognition of Ed Wood Sr. and his 1890 purchase of the first black-owned plantation in Arkansas.

In the period following Radical Reconstruction, Ed Wood, Sr. began hosting gathering of the Prince Hall Freemasonry, of which he was a founding member of the Arkansas Lodge and held rank of highest degree. It was in these meetings at the Wood Plantation that he became an associated with Scipio Africanus Jones, John E. Bush, Chester W. Keatts, and John Hamilton McConico. From these meetings, a vibrant African-American Establishment matured. Wood was able to sustain the Prince Hall Lodge, but his contemporaries spun off to form the Mosaic Templars of America.

Education
It is within the Pulaski County Special School District.

It is zoned to Daisy Bates Elementary School, Fuller Middle School, and Wilbur D. Mills University Studies High School.

References

External links
Woodson Lateral Road 

Census-designated places in Pulaski County, Arkansas
Census-designated places in Arkansas
Census-designated places in Little Rock–North Little Rock–Conway metropolitan area
Populated places established in 1880
1880 establishments in Arkansas